More4 is a British free-to-air television channel, owned by Channel Four Television Corporation. The channel launched on 5 October 2005. Its programming mainly focuses on lifestyle and documentaries, as well as foreign dramas.

Content 
When the channel first launched in 2005, it mostly focused on US dramas and repeats of Channel 4 programmes.

Having shown all five weekday editions of The Daily Show since More4's launch, in January 2011 the channel scaled back its commitment to one episode per week in order to increase investment in its arts programming.

On 23 January 2012, More4 re-focused towards more lifestyle-based content. Documentaries which previously aired on the channel moved to Channel 4.

More4's schedule runs every day from 08:55 to 04:00. More4 shows programmes from TJC during downtime.

Branding

2005–2012

In September 2005, Channel 4 began running teaser trailers for the new station (although the name was neither mentioned nor seen in the adverts). Showing neon lettering, the teasers hinted at "adult entertainment". Some people may have been confused by the deliberate double-meaning of these trailers and mistakenly presumed the new channel would be of a pornographic nature. Advertisements starting at the end of September made it much clearer that the "adult entertainment" being offered was the 'intelligent and insightful' programming. Viewing figures for the launch date gave More4 an average figure of 269,000 viewers, compared to E4's 296,000. The original More4 branding was designed by Spin and animated by DBLG.

2012–present
On 23 January 2012, More4 adopted a new logo and on-air branding. The logo and channel idents were designed by London-based design and motion company ManvsMachine and Channel 4's in-house agency, 4Creative. The repositioning of the brand coincided with the channel's move towards more lifestyle content and a move away from documentaries and arts. The idents focus on moving mechanical "scrapbooks" which also refers to the Digital Scrapbook platform.

A new logo and branding was introduced on 27 September 2018, which included a version of the original stylised numeral "4" logo, as designed by Martin Lambie-Nairn and Colin Robinson, with the word "More" imposed on top of it. The branding was not a major overhaul, as the other idents stayed the same but revised. This was part of the Channel 4 major rebranding across all their channels. In November 2022, on the 40th anniversary of the original "4" logo being shown on British TV screens, Channel Four Television Corporation announced that all their channel names would be changed in 2023 to include the words "Channel 4" in them.

Availability 
Space was reserved on Freeview multiplex C for the channel. However, despite Channel 4 saying that the channel would appear on multiplex C, the channel appeared on multiplex 2. A place holder appeared on the Freeview EPG at number 13 on 13 September and after a time, ran a looping teaser trailer. More4 +1 became available on the DTT platform on 14 December 2005. It was removed on 18 May 2006, to make way for live coverage of Big Brother, and the Freeview launch of Film4 later in the year. More4 +1 relaunched on Freeview in January 2017 but was removed again on 30 June 2022 due to the closure of the COM7 multiplex.

While More4 is available on most cable platforms, More4 +1 was available on Virgin Media until 20 August 2007 when it was replaced by Channel 4 +1 across the digital television network. It was re-added on 15 January 2013.

Despite initial advertising and official internet communication that it would be free-to-air on satellite television, More4 was encrypted under Sky's pay TV scheme until 6 May 2008 when it dropped its NDS encryption and went free-to-air. It joined the BBC and ITV's new satellite platform, Freesat on the same day.

More4 is available outside the UK where it is available to viewers in Ireland via Sky and Virgin Media Ireland's digital service. This led to further speculation that Channel 4 would eventually launch on Sky in Ireland, which it did in December 2006. Channel 4 has already made its other flagship channels: E4, E4 +1, Film4 and Film4 +1 available in Ireland via Sky, Virgin Media Ireland digital TV providers. Channel 4 itself is available on almost all Irish cable and MMDS systems (in some cases Channel 4 is replaced with S4C). In Switzerland, the channel is available among other Channel 4 branded channels on UPC Switzerland and on Swisscom TV. The channel is registered to broadcast within the European Union/EEA through the Luxembourg Broadcasting Regulator (ALIA). 

More4 +2 launched on 16 April 2012 on Sky channel 269, in the lifestyle section of the guide. The temporary channel, which aired for a limited period between 7:45 pm and 11.00 pm, was short-lived, because it closed on 26 June 2012 ahead of the launch of 4seven on 4 July.

HD feed
Channel 4 anticipated that More4 HD would launch in 2011, however a launch did not occur. As part of More4's rebrand in January 2012, ManvsMachine created the channel logo for More4 HD. On 14 September 2012, Channel 4 announced that More4 HD would launch on Sky. The channel then launched on 4 February 2013. More4 HD also became available to Virgin Media viewers on channel 203 on 1 October 2013.

Logos

See also
 Channel 4
 E4
 Film4
 List of television stations in the United Kingdom

References

 BBC report on More4
 Digital Spy report

External links

SES guide to receiving Astra satellites

Channel 4 television channels
Television channels in the United Kingdom
Television channels and stations established in 2005
2005 establishments in the United Kingdom